The Whitelaw Hotel is an historic structure located in the U Street Corridor (a.k.a. Cardozo/Shaw) in Northwest Washington, D.C.  It was listed on the National Register of Historic Places in 1993.

History
The Whitelaw was built as an upscale apartment hotel in the Italian Renaissance Revival style for $158,000 in 1919.  The building was designed by architect Isaiah T. Hatton, who was one of the nation's first African American architects.  It was named for the mother of its builder, entrepreneur John Whitelaw Lewis who also founded Industrial Savings Bank. It was completely financed and built by African American entrepreneurs, investors, designers, and craftsmen as a place of meeting and public accommodation for prominent African Americans during segregation.  The hotel was listed in Victor Green's Green Book, a guide for African American travelers. Entertainers, such as Cab Calloway, who performed on U Street stayed at the Whitelaw as well as other African Americans who came to Washington  for meetings of national black organizations and could not stay in the city's other hotels.  Its large public spaces allowed the Whitelaw to become an important social center.

The end of legal Segregation in the United States and the rise in drugs in the neighborhood led to the decline of the Whitelaw.  It was closed by the city in 1977 and was slated for demolition.  Manna, Inc bought the building in 1991 and used historic tax credits to renovate it into low- and moderate-income housing.  It re-opened  in 1992.

References

Hotel buildings completed in 1919
Apartment buildings in Washington, D.C.
Renaissance Revival architecture in Washington, D.C.
Residential buildings on the National Register of Historic Places in Washington, D.C.
Hotel buildings on the National Register of Historic Places in Washington, D.C.
African-American history of Washington, D.C.
Individually listed contributing properties to historic districts on the National Register in Washington, D.C.